The 17th East Bosnia Assault Division was Yugoslav Partisan division formed on 2 July 1943. The division was formed from the 6th East Bosnia Brigade, the 1st Majevica Brigade and Majevica Detachment. Gligorije Mandić was a commander of the division while its political commissar was Branko Petričević. The division was under the direct command of the Supreme Headquarters until 20 September 1943 when it came under the command of the 3rd Corps. During a brief time in May and June 1944, it was again under the command of the Supreme Headquarters, following that it became a part of the 2nd Corps. The division mostly fought in Bosnia and Serbia.

References 

Divisions of the Yugoslav Partisans
Military units and formations established in 1943